Papyrus Oxyrhynchus 3035 (or P. Oxy. XLII 3035) is a warrant for the arrest of a Christian, issued by the authorities of the Roman Empire. This is one of the earliest uses of the word Christian attested on papyrus.

The order was issued by the head of the Oxyrhynchus ruling council, to the police in a country village, to arrest a man described as a Christian (note χρισιανόν, the papyrus has the early spelling, χρησιανόν). The charge which makes the Christian liable for arrest is not given. 

The manuscript is dated precisely in its closing lines to the third year of the co-regency of Valerian and Gallienus his son, in the third day of the Egyptian month Phamenoth (known as Paremhat in the Coptic calendar). The equivalent date in our Gregorian calendar is 28 February 256 AD.

Text

See also
Libellus
Oxyrhynchus papyri

References

External links
'P.Oxy. XLII 3035'. Oxyrhynchus Papyri Project. Oxford University.

3035
3rd-century manuscripts
3rd-century Christian texts
Persecution of early Christians
3rd century in Egypt
Sackler library manuscripts